Sputnik Islands is a pair of ice-covered islands, one much larger than the other, located between Capes Cheetham and Williams in the entrance to Ob' Bay. The islands were photographed from the air by U.S. Navy Operation Highjump, 1946–47. Surveyed by the Soviet Antarctic Expedition, 1958, and named after the first Soviet artificial earth satellite ("Sputnik").

See also 
 List of antarctic and sub-antarctic islands

Islands of Victoria Land
Pennell Coast